Nggatokae Island is an island in the New Georgia Islands  within Western Province, Solomon Islands.
It is served by Gatokae Aerodrome.

The island is an extinct volcano, the highest peak is Mount Mariu (887 m.).

The island has an area of 93 km2, and a population of 2,367 (1999 census).

See also
 
 Penjuku, a coastal village

Islands of the Solomon Islands
Western Province (Solomon Islands)